Federal elections were held in Switzerland on 24 October 1999. Although the Swiss People's Party received the most votes for the first time in the party's history, the Social Democratic Party remained the largest party in the National Council, winning 51 of the 200 seats.

Results

National Council

By constituency

Council of the States

References

1999 elections in Switzerland
Federal elections in Switzerland
Switzerland